Brett Johnson may refer to:
 Brett Johnson (Australian footballer) (born 1981), Australian rules footballer
 Brett Johnson (cricketer) (born 1994), New Zealand cricketer
 Brett Johnson (footballer born 1985), English footballer
 Brett Johnson (writer), American television writer
 Brett Johnson, former cybercriminal and co-founder of the website ShadowCrew

See also
Brett Johnston